The Revista Mexicana de Ciencias Geológicas is a triannual peer-reviewed open-access scientific journal published by the National Autonomous University of Mexico, Sociedad Geológica Mexicana, Instituto Nacional de Geoquímica, and Sociedad Mexicana de Paleontología. It covers the field of geology and related Earth sciences, primarily on issues that are relevant to Latin America and Mexico. It was established in 1976 and the editors-in-chief are Angel F. Nieto Samaniego and Peter Schaaf (National Autonomous University of Mexico).

Abstracting and indexing
The journal is abstracted and indexed in:

According to the Journal Citation Reports, the journal has a 2016 impact factor of 0.815.

References

External links
 

Geology journals
Publications established in 1976
Multilingual journals
Open access journals
Triannual journals
National Autonomous University of Mexico
Academic journals published by universities and colleges
Academic journals published by learned and professional societies